Jalan Sungai Buaya, Federal Route 1208, is a federal road in Selangor, Malaysia.
The Kilometre Zero is located at the road's junction with Jalan Bukit Beruntung.

At most sections, the Federal Route 1208 was built to the JKR R5 road standard, with a speed limit of 90 km/h.

List of junctions

Malaysian Federal Roads